The Nigeria national cricket team is the men's team that represents the country of Nigeria in international cricket. Cricket has been played in the country since the late 19th century, and the national team played their first match in 1904, when a team representing the Lagos Colony played the Gold Coast Colony. The Nigeria Cricket Association has been an associate member of the International Cricket Council (ICC) since 2002.

History

Early years

Cricket has been played in Nigeria since the late 19th century when the game was introduced by the British. Contacts between the administration in Lagos and their counterparts in Gold Coast (now Ghana) led to an international at Race Course (now Tafawa Balewa Square), Lagos on 25 May 1904, the Gold Coast winning by 22 runs.

The match became an annual fixture and for the first three matches was multi-racial. The fourth fixture in December 1906 was for Europeans only, and the African population started their own annual fixture in 1907. Internationals stopped for the First World War, and did not restart until the mid-1920s.

Between the two world wars, cricket began to become more formally organised in the country with two cricket associations for the Europeans and Africans being formed in 1932 and 1933 respectively. First-class cricketers from England began to appear in the annual matches against Gold Coast, and the 1939 match, the last before World War II ended in a 58 run win for Gold Coast.

Matches resumed after the war with a five-day match in Lagos in 1947 which ended in a draw. The 1949 match went the way of the Gold Coast. As the number of Europeans working in the country reduced, the quality of the African players increased and cricket began to be organised on multi-racial lines in 1956.

Post independence

Following Nigeria's independence in 1960, there was much interest in cricket. Annual matches against Sierra Leone and The Gambia began in 1964, and were evenly contested until the late 1970s, when football began to become more popular in the country. Cricket began a process of decline, and when Tanzania toured in 1974, Nigeria lost two of the three matches and drew the other. They also lost heavily to the MCC in 1976. Internal problems with both the Nigeria Cricket Association and in Nigeria itself led to a decline in standards, though Nigeria formed a majority of the players on the West Africa cricket team that became an ICC associate member in 1976.

The West Africa team took part in the ICC Trophy tournaments of 1982 and 1997 before withdrawing from the 2001 tournament in Ontario. Nigeria still continued to play on their own on occasion, though they sometimes withdrew from tournaments, as at the 1998 Africa Cricket Association Championship. The West African Cricket Conference ceased to exist in 2002, and Nigeria became an associate member of the ICC in their own right the same year.

ICC membership

Nigeria's first tournament after becoming an ICC member on their own was the 2002 Africa Cup in Zambia. Nigeria finished fourth in their group after their only win of the tournament against Malawi. They finished 5th in the Africa Cricket Association Championships in 2004, their only win coming against last placed Tanzania, thus failing to qualify for the 2005 ICC Trophy.

In August 2006, Nigeria took part in Division Two of the World Cricket League Africa Region in Tanzania, finishing last. This originally relegated them to Division Three, though they are not playing in that tournament in 2008. They won the North West Africa Championship in 2007 and 2008.
Nigeria are played in Division Two of the World Cricket League Africa Region in 2008 and came second hence qualifying for 2009 ICC World Cricket League Division Seven. They came 3rd in the tournament thus remaining in the division .
In May 2011 Nigeria participated in the 2011 ICC World Cricket League Division Seven in Botswana. Nigeria came second in tournament this qualifying for 2011 ICC World Cricket League Division Six. Then the team went to South Africa in May 2011 to participate in 2011 ICC Africa Division Two (T20) en route to qualification of 2012 ICC World Twenty20. They won the tournament and qualified for 2011 ICC Africa Division One.

In August 2018, they were included in the 2018 Africa T20 Cup tournament.

2018–present
In April 2018, the ICC decided to grant full Twenty20 International (T20I) status to all its members. Therefore, all Twenty20 matches played between Nigeria and other ICC members since 1 January 2019 have been full T20Is. Nigeria's first T20I match was against Kenya on 20 May 2019, after finishing second in the North-Western sub-region qualification group, advancing to the Regional Final of the 2018–19 ICC World Twenty20 Africa Qualifier tournament.

In July 2019, the ICC suspended Zimbabwe Cricket, with the team barred from taking part in ICC events. As a result of their suspension, the ICC confirmed that Nigeria would replace them in the 2019 ICC T20 World Cup Qualifier tournament.

Grounds
The 2,000-capacity Tafawa Balewa Square Oval in Lagos is the largest cricket stadium in Nigeria.

Tournament history

World Cup

1975: Not eligible – Not an ICC member
1979 to 2003: See West African cricket team
2007 to present: Did not qualify

ICC World T20 Qualifier

 2019: 14th place

ICC Trophy

1979 to 2001: See West Africa cricket team
2005: Did not qualify

ICC World Cricket League
2009: 3rd place (Division Seven)
2011: 2nd place (Division Seven)
2011: 5th place (Division Six)
2013: 1st place (Division Seven)
2013: 2nd place (Division Six)
2014: 4th place (Division Five)
2016: 6th place (Division Five)

ICC World Cricket League Africa Region

2006: 5th place (Division Two)
2011: 1st place (Division Two)(T20)

Records and Statistics 

International Match Summary — Nigeria
 
Last updated 9 December 2022

Twenty20 International 
 Highest team total: 221/7 v. Eswatini on 4 December 2022 at Rwanda Cricket Stadium, Kigali
 Highest individual score: 76, Ashmit Shreshta v. Eswatini on 4 December 2022 at Rwanda Cricket Stadium, Kigali
 Best individual bowling figures: 6/5, Peter Aho v. Sierra Leone on 24 October 2021 at University of Lagos Cricket Oval, Lagos

Most T20I runs for Nigeria

Most T20I wickets for Nigeria

T20I record versus other nations

Records complete to T20I #1951. Last updated 9 December 2022.

Other First Class records

Performances by Nigerian cricketers in World Cricket League since 2009

Highest Scores+

Dotun Olatunji – 127 vs Ghana at BCA Oval No. 1, Gaborone on 7 April 2013

Dotun Olatunji – 125* vs Botswana at BCA Oval No. 2, Gaborone on 9 April 2013

Olajide Bejide – 106 vs Tanzania at Royal Selangor Club, Kuala Lumpur on 13 March 2014

Segun Olayinka – 94* vs Argentina at Grainville, St Saviour on 28 July 2013

Endurance Ofem – 90 vs Cayman Islands at Kinrara Academy Oval, Kuala Lumpur on 9 March 2014

Best bowling figures

Oluseye Olympio – 6/23 vs Argentina at Grainville, St Saviour on 28 July 2013

Saeed Akolade – 6/27 vs Bahrain at Farmers CC, St Martin on 25 July 2013

Joshua Ogunlola – 5/28 vs Botswana at BCA Oval No. 2, Gaborone on 9 April 2013

Joshua Ogunlola – 5/34 vs Germany at BCA Oval No. 2, Gaborone on 12 April 2013

Olajide Bejide – 4/20 vs Kuwait at BCA Oval No. 1, Gaborone on 8 May 2011

Highest team total: 397/7 declared v Gold Coast, 1932.
Highest individual score: 166 by E Henshaw v Ghana, 1982 and by B Olufawo v Ghana, 2001.
Best bowling: 7/65 by WS King v Gold Coast, 1952.

Current squad

This lists all the players who have played for Nigeria in the past 12 months or has been part of the latest T20I squad. Updated as of 9 December 2022.

Players
The following players have represented Nigeria internationally and also played first-class cricket:

 Henry Savory – played for Gloucestershire in 1937.
 Richard Parkhouse – played for Glamorgan in 1939.
 Geoffrey Anson – played for Cambridge University and Kent in 1947.
 Robert Melsome – played for Gloucestershire between 1925 and 1934.
 William Shirley – played for Hampshire and Cambridge University between 1922 and 1925.

Coaching history
2009–2011:  Clive Ogbimi
2011–2012:  Sean Phillips
2012–2019:  Clive Ogbimi
2020–2022:  Asanka Gurusinha
2022:  Clive Ogbimi (interim)
2022–present:  Steve Tikolo

See also
 List of Nigeria Twenty20 International cricketers
 Nigeria women's national cricket team

References

Cricket in Nigeria
National cricket teams
Cricket
Nigeria in international cricket